Micropterix monticolella is a species of moth belonging to the family Micropterigidae. It was described by Kozlov, in 1982. It is known from the Caucasus.

The wingspan is about 8.8 mm.

References

Micropterigidae
Moths described in 1982